Bekadil Shaimerdenov (born 22 July 1997) is an Kazakhstani judoka.

He won Bronze medals at the 2017 Summer Universiade and the 2018 Judo Grand Prix Agadir.

References

External links
 
 

1997 births
Living people
Kazakhstani male judoka